Gvidas Juška (born 17 August 1982 in Lithuania) is a Lithuanian footballer.

Career

At the age of 14, Juška boarded at the Lithuanian Olympic Sports Center, along with other athletes.

In 2010, Juška signed for Shuvalan in Azerbaijan, which was sponsored by an Azerbaijani airline and where the team was accommodated at a five-star hotel. Despite helping the club reach fourth place and qualify for European competition, he was released at the end of the season.

After playing for FK Kruoja Pakruojis, Juška did not receive offers that interested him, so went to Norway, where he worked in construction.

References

External links
 Gvidas Juška at Soccerway

Lithuanian footballers
Living people
Association football forwards
Association football midfielders
1982 births
AZAL PFK players
FK Palanga players
FK Banga Gargždai players